This is a list of holidays in Benin.

Public holidays

Movable holidays
The following holidays are public holidays but the date on which each occurs varies, according to its corresponding calendar, and thus has no set date. In order in which they occur:

References 

Benin
Beninese culture
Benin